Kaikohe railway station was a station on the Okaihau Branch in New Zealand.

The station opened on 1 May 1914 and closed for passengers on 21 June 1976, freight on 10 March 1987 and fully on 1 November 1987.

References

Defunct railway stations in New Zealand
Rail transport in the Northland Region
Buildings and structures in the Northland Region
Railway stations opened in 1914
Railway stations closed in 1987
Kaikohe